Allington is a hamlet in north Wiltshire, England.

Allington Bar is a farm and small hamlet on the A420.

Allington Manor Farmhouse is from the mid 18th century and incorporates fragments of a 17th-century manor house; further fragments are within an 18th-century barn. Bolehyde Manor, a Grade II* listed 17th-century manor house and former home of Camilla Parker-Bowles, is a short distance north of Allington village.

This Allington is not a former parish, but was a tithing of the parish of Chippenham. Since 1894 it has been in the civil parish of Chippenham Without.

The settlement was designated as a conservation area in 1998, and in 2002 the area was extended to include the surrounding landscape.

References 

Hamlets in Wiltshire
Chippenham Without